Paul Arpin (born 20 February 1960 in Bourg-Saint-Maurice) is a retired long-distance runner from France, who represented his native country in the men's 10,000 metres at the 1988 Summer Olympics, finishing in seventh place.

Paul Arpin also finished third at the 1987 IAAF World Cross Country Championships behind Kenyans John Ngugi and Paul Kipkoech. He was also part of the bronze medal-winning French team at the 1988 edition behind Kenya and Ethiopia (Paul Arpin finished 11th individually)

Achievements

References
 1988 Year Ranking

1960 births
Living people
French male long-distance runners
Athletes (track and field) at the 1988 Summer Olympics
Olympic athletes of France
People from Bourg-Saint-Maurice
Sportspeople from Savoie
20th-century French people